Werner van den Valckert (ca. 1585 - after 1635) was a Dutch Golden Age painter and engraver.

Biography

Though he was born in Amsterdam, he became a member of the Guild of St. Luke in the Hague between 1600 - 1605. By 1614 he had moved to Amsterdam, because his daughter was baptized there. His earliest dated etchings are from 1612. His surviving paintings are historical allegories and portraits. He also made a prestigious schuttersstuk, which features the Amsterdam burgermeester Albert Burgh.

According to Houbraken, he was a student of Hendrik Goltzius. He painted a series of 4 paintings showing a doctor as angel, Christ, a man, and the devil; these were all based on engravings by Goltzius. These paintings are now in the possession of the Boerhaave Museum, which has other similar series on display. He also made a series of 4 paintings about relief for the poor, now in the possession of the Amsterdam Historical Museum.

According to the RKD, his pupil was Andries Jeremias.

References

1580s births
1630s deaths
Dutch Golden Age painters
Dutch male painters
Painters from The Hague
Painters from Amsterdam